Martin Davis Hardin  (June 26, 1837 –  December 12, 1923) was a brigadier general in the Union Army during the American Civil War. He was appointed a brigadier general on July 6, 1864, to rank from July 2, 1864, the date of U.S. Senate confirmation of his promotion.

Early life and education
Hardin was born in Jacksonville, Illinois, the son of John J. Hardin.  He was a family friend and protégé of Abraham Lincoln. Although widely reported that it was at the Hardin family home that Lincoln first met his wife, Mary Todd, this is most likely false. Lincoln and his future wife probably met in Springfield. Hardin graduated from West Point in the Class of 1859, and was an aide to Robert E. Lee in the hanging of John Brown soon after.

Military service
Hardin served as a colonel in the 12th Pennsylvania Reserve Regiment.  He lost his left arm in the Mine Run Campaign, but continued serving in the army. He was mustered out of the volunteer service in June 1864 but returned to active duty on July 2 with an appointment to brigadier general.  General Hardin commanded a division in the XXII Corps during the battle of Fort Stevens.

After retiring in December 1870, he became a lawyer in Chicago, and had a winter home in St. Augustine, Florida.  His second wife, Amelia McLaughlin (1863–1939) was the sister-in-law of Irene Castle, the well-known dancer.  Hardin spent his last years in the famous "Union Generals' House" at 20 Valencia Street in St. Augustine, Florida (saved from a proposed demolition by Flagler College in the 1980s through the concerted action of local history lovers). Hardin was one of the last surviving Civil War generals of either side at the time of his death in 1923.  He is buried, with his wife, at the U.S. National Cemetery in St. Augustine.  His widow honored him by building a chapel (complete with a statue of St. Martin) on the grounds of the Mission of Nombre de Dios in St. Augustine.

See also

List of American Civil War generals (Union)

Notes

References
Eicher, John H., and David J. Eicher, Civil War High Commands. Stanford: Stanford University Press, 2001. .
Hardin biography
David Nolan, The Houses of St. Augustine, Pineapple Press, 1995.
James T. Huffstodt. Lincoln's Bold Lion: The Life and Times of Brigadier General Martin Davis Hardin.  Philadelphia and Oxford, England: Casemate Publisher. (2015)
Ezra J. Warner. Generals In Blue: Lives of the Union Commanders (page 205-206). Baton Rouge and London: Louisiana State University Press. (1964)

Union Army generals
People from Jacksonville, Illinois
People from St. Augustine, Florida
Lawyers from Chicago
United States Military Academy alumni
People of Pennsylvania in the American Civil War
1837 births
1923 deaths
19th-century American lawyers
Military personnel from Illinois